The Promise is a 2016 South Korean television series starring Lee Yu-ri (in a twin role), Seo Jun-young, Park Ha-na and Song Jong-ho. It airs on KBS2 on Mondays to Fridays at 19:50, for 102 episodes with the first episode airing on February 1, 2016.

Plot
Na-Yeon (Lee Yu-Ri) is a bright woman. She supports her boyfriend Tae-Joon (Seo Jun-Young), who is from a poor background, and has even given up entering a university. But Tae-Joon dumps her for his success and goes with Se-Jin (Park Ha-Na), who is a granddaughter of Baekdo Company president. Do-Hee (Lee Yu-Ri) is Na-Yeon’s twin sister, who was separated from her at birth. Hence, they have never met each other. Do-Hee works as a reporter at a weekly magazine, and is the girlfriend of Hwi-Kyung (Song Jong-Ho), who is successor of Baekdo Company, and Se-Jin's step-uncle. After a series of events, Se-Jin's family wrongfully placed Na-Yeon in a mental hospital. Do-Hee manages to track Na-Yeon down, and they switch places. Shortly after, Do-Hee dies in Nayeon's place when the building catches fire. After her death, Na-Yeon decides to take revenge. She takes on the identity of Do-Hee, then marries Hwi-Kyung, marrying into Se-Jin's family in the process.

Cast

Main cast
 Lee Yu-ri as Lee Na-yeon / Baek Do-hee (dual role) (32 years old)
 Park Seo-yeon as young Lee Na-yeon / Baek Do-hee (12 years old)
 Seo Jun-young as Kang Tae-joon (32 years old)
 Choi Min-young as young Kang Tae-joon (12 years old)
 Song Jong-ho as Park Hwi-kyung (35 years old)
 Jang Do-yoon as young Park Hwi-kyung (15 years old)
 Park Ha-na as Jang Se-jin (32 years old)
 Gong Yeon-sung as young Jang Se-jin (12 years old)

Supporting cast
Lee Na-yeon's family
 Yoon Bok-in as Yang Mal-sook
 Jo Hye-sun as Lee Eun-bong
 Kim Esther as young Lee Eun-bong
 Han Ga-rim as Lee Geum-bong
 Kim Min-kyul as young Lee Geum-bong
 Im Hyun-sung as Lee Joong-dae

Jang Se-jin's family 
 Lee Jong-won as Jang Kyung-wan
 Kim Hye-ri as Park Yoo-kyung
 Kim Do-yeon as Yoon Young-sook
 Yoon Joo-sang as Park Man-jae

Kang Tae-joon's family 
 Oh Young-shil as Oh Man-jung
 Song Young-kyu as Heo Poong-dal
 Kang Bong-sung as Heo Se-kwang

Baek Do-hee's family 
 Kim Bo-mi as Ahn Sung-joo
 Park Chan-hwan as Baek Dong-jin

Others
 Kim Bo-min as Lee Sae-byul
 Yoon Byung-hee as Team leader Bae
 Lee Seol-goo as Park Joon-ik
 Hong Seung-bum as Park Hee-suk

Guest appearances
 Lee Yeon-soo as Lee Yoon-ae
 Yoon Da-hoon as Lee Ki-man

Ratings
The blue numbers represent the lowest ratings and the red numbers represent the highest ratings
NR denotes that the drama did not rank in the top 20 daily programs on that date

Awards and nominations

International broadcast 
The series aired, one week after initial broadcast, on KBS World with subtitles.

It started airing in Singapore on Channel U. Starting Feb 8 2018.

References

External links
  
 
 

2016 South Korean television series debuts
Korean-language television shows
Television series about revenge
Korean Broadcasting System television dramas
South Korean melodrama television series